Jeetram Dudi also known as Jeet Ram is an Indian Politician and member X & XII Rajasthan Legislative Assembly from Malpura in Tonk district in Rajasthan.

He was born in a Jat Hindu family of Dudi Clan on 16 March 1953 at village Tejakhera near Chautala, of Sirsa district in Haryana, India. His mother's name was Naina Devi and father's name was Ch. Laxman Ram Dudi.

References
 
 www.india.gov.in/allimpfrms/alldocs/8232.pdf. Archived at 

Living people
Rajasthani politicians
People from Tonk district
Rajasthan MLAs 2003–2008
Rajasthan MLAs 1993–1998
Year of birth missing (living people)
Bharatiya Janata Party politicians from Rajasthan